Monthelon may refer to:

Monthelon, Marne, a commune in the French region of Champagne-Ardenne
Monthelon, Saône-et-Loire a commune in the French region of Bourgogne